Bhimpokhara is a village development committee in Baglung District in the Dhaulagiri Zone of central Nepal. At the time of the 1991 Nepal census it had a population of 2,907 and had 545 houses in the village.

References

Populated places in Baglung District